Kendal Thompkins (born September 16, 1989) is an American football wide receiver who is currently a free agent. Thompkins was signed as an undrafted free agent by the Orlando Predators in 2014. Thompkins played college football at Miami.

Early years
In 2007, Thompkins recorded 46 receptions, 839 receiving yards and team-best 14 receiving touchdowns in his Senior season and also playing for 2007 consensus national championship Miami Northwestern Senior High School football team. He was selected to inaugural Under Armour All-Star game He was ranked as the 76th best wide receiver and 83rd best overall player in state of Florida by Rivals.com. He was ranked as the 89th best wide receiver by ESPN and he was rated 209th overall player in nation by Scout.com. He was selected to PrepStar All-Southeast Region team.

College career
He played college football at the University of Miami. He finished college 14 receptions, 152 receiving yards and 3 receiving touchdowns.

Professional career

Orlando Predators
In 2014, Thompkins signed with the Orlando Predators of the Arena Football League. Thompkins had 33 receiving touchdowns as of the 2015 Arena Football season. On July 5, 2016, Thompkins was placed on recallable reassignment.

Baltimore Brigade
On May 11, 2017, Thompkins was assigned to the Baltimore Brigade. On June 1, 2017, Thompkins was placed on recallable reassignment.

Tampa Bay Storm
On June 26, 2017, Thompkins was assigned to the Tampa Bay Storm. He was placed on reassignment on July 20, 2017.

Jacksonville Sharks
On April 30, 2018, Thompkins was activated by the Jacksonville Sharks of the National Arena League.

Washington Valor
On May 7, 2019, Thompkins was assigned to the Washington Valor.

Personal life
His brother is New York Jets wide receiver Kenbrell Thompkins and his cousin is NFL receiver Antonio Brown.

References

External links

Miami Hurricanes bio 
Orlando Predators bio

Living people
American football wide receivers
1989 births
Miami Hurricanes football players
Orlando Predators players
Players of American football from Miami
Miami Northwestern Senior High School alumni
Baltimore Brigade players
Tampa Bay Storm players
Jacksonville Sharks players
Washington Valor players